Lauren Nourse (born 10 August 1982) is a former Australia netball international. Between 2007 and 2011 she made 25 senior appearances for Australia. Nourse was a member of the Australia teams that won the gold medal at the 2007 World Netball Championships and the silver medal at the 2010 Commonwealth Games. Between 2004 and 2012, Nourse played for Queensland Firebirds. In 2011 she captained Firebirds when they won the 2011 ANZ Championship.

Early life and education
Nourse is originally from South Australia. She was born in Loxton and grew up in Port Lincoln where she attended St Joseph's School and played netball for Saint Mary's. She later attended Immanuel College, Adelaide.

Playing career

South Australia
Between 1998 and 2003, Nourse represented South Australia in the Australian National Netball Championships at under-17, under-19, under-21 and Open levels.

Contax
Nourse also played for Contax in the South Australia state league. In 2002, together with Natalie von Bertouch, Carla Dziwoki and Kirby Mutton, she was a member of the Contax team that won the state league title.

AIS Canberra Darters
In 2003, Nourse played for AIS Canberra Darters in the Commonwealth Bank Trophy league under coach Norma Plummer.

Queensland Firebirds
Between 2004 and 2012, Nourse played for Queensland Firebirds, initially in the Commonwealth Bank Trophy league and later in the ANZ Championship. Between 2010 and 2012, she served as Firebirds' team captain. In 2011 she captained Firebirds when they won the 2011 ANZ Championship. She captained Firebirds to ten successive wins, helping them secure the minor premiership and a place in the play-offs. However on 10 April, in a Round 9 match against Central Pulse, Nourse suffered an anterior cruciate ligament injury which ended her season. After making a comeback during the 2012 season, she announced her retirement in October 2012.

Australia
Between 2007 and 2011, Nourse made 25 senior appearances for Australia. She previously represented Australia at under-21 level. She made her senior debut for Australia on 21 July 2007 against New Zealand. Nourse was called into the senior team as an injury replacement for Mo'onia Gerrard after impressing national selectors during an unofficial practice match against England. She became the first Queensland Firebirds player since Vicki Wilson to represent Australia. Coincidentally, in 2007 Wilson was Nourse's head coach at Firebirds. Nourse was subsequently a member of the Australia teams that won the gold medal at the 2007 World Netball Championships and the silver medal at the 2010 Commonwealth Games. She was expected to represent Australia at the 2011 World Netball Championships, however she was ruled out after suffering an ACL injury while playing for Firebirds.

Teaching career
Nourse works as teacher and netball coach. Since 2014, she has served as a director of netball at Matthew Flinders Anglican College. In 2016 and 2017 she guided the netball team to two successive Vicki Wilson Cup wins. The Vicki Wilson Cup is Netball Queensland's top level school competition. She previously worked as a teacher at St Peters Lutheran College.

Honours
Australia
World Netball Championships
Winners: 2007
Commonwealth Games
Runners Up: 2010
Queensland Firebirds
ANZ Championship
Winners: 2011
Contax
South Australia state league
Winners: 2002

References

Living people
1982 births
Australian netball players
Australia international netball players
Australia international Fast5 players
Netball players at the 2010 Commonwealth Games
Commonwealth Games medallists in netball
Commonwealth Games silver medallists for Australia
Netball players from South Australia
AIS Canberra Darters players
Queensland Firebirds players
Contax Netball Club players
South Australia state netball league players
ANZ Championship players
Australian netball coaches
Australian schoolteachers
People from Loxton, South Australia
People educated at Immanuel College, Adelaide
2007 World Netball Championships players
Medallists at the 2010 Commonwealth Games